Jess M. Bravin (born 1965) is an American journalist. Since 2005, he has been the Wall Street Journal correspondent for the United States Supreme Court.

Background
Bravin graduated from Harvard College, where he wrote from 1985 to 1987 for the Harvard Crimson. His roommate at Harvard was Peter Sagal, humorist, writer, and host of NPR game show Wait Wait... Don't Tell Me!. He later earned his J.D. degree from the University of California, Berkeley, School of Law (Boalt Hall).

Career

Early in his career, Bravin was a reporter for the Los Angeles Times and contributed to including the Washington Post, Harper’s Bazaar, and Spy magazine.  He also read scripts for a talent agency and managed a campaign for a local school board. While in law school, he served on the University of California Board of Regents and as a City Council appointee to the Berkeley, Calif., Police Review Commission and Zoning Adjustments Board.

Bravin joined the Wall Street Journal first as it California editor in San Francisco.  He then became its national legal-affairs reporter.  In 2005, he became Supreme Court correspondent for the Wall Street Journal.

He has taught at the University of California Washington Center.

Personal
Bravin led the effort to designate Raymond Chandler Square (Los Angeles City Historic-Cultural Monument No. 597) in Hollywood, in honor of the hard-boiled novelist.

Awards and recognition

 John Jacobs Fellowship at Berkeley's Graduate School of Journalism and Institute of Governmental Studies
 John Field Simms Sr. Memorial Lectureship in Law at the University of New Mexico's School of Law
 Elizabeth Neuffer Memorial Prize
 American Bar Association's Silver Gavel Award
 National Press Foundation
 New York News Publishers Association
 New York Press Club

Works

Books:
 Squeaky: The Life and Times of Lynette Alice Fromme (1997)
 The Terror Courts: Rough Justice at Guantanamo Bay (2014)

Chapters:
Bravin has contributed to:
 Violence in America: An Encyclopedia
 Crimes of War 2.0
 A Concise Introduction to Logic

Articles:
 Wall Street Journal (latest)

References

External links
 
 

1965 births
20th-century American journalists
21st-century American journalists
American male journalists
Harvard College alumni
Living people
The Harvard Crimson people
The Wall Street Journal people
UC Berkeley School of Law alumni
Los Angeles Times people